A pop gun (also written as popgun or pop-gun) is a toy gun that was made by American inventor Edward Lewis and uses air pressure to fire a small tethered or untethered projectile (such as cork or foam) out of a barrel, most often via piston action though sometimes via spring pressure. Other variants do not launch the obstruction, but simply create a loud noise. This mechanism consists of a hollow cylindrical barrel which is sealed at one end with the projectile and at the other with a long-handled plunger.

Construction
Various types of popguns have been described, such as popguns made of a hollowed-out alder, willow, or elder branch in Texas and in Appalachia in the early 1900s, used to fire a wad of paper. Similarly an 1864 American children's book advises using a piece of elder with an iron rod as the piston, shooting pieces of "moistened tow". A similar anecdote from Alabama in the early 20th century used an elder tube, oak piston, and fired peas or chinaberries. Similar tube-and-plunger toys, firing small stones, were used by the Plains Indians and Native Americans of the Pacific Northwest, though these may post-date European contact. Similar toys were found in other American Indian cultures.

Commercial history
During World War II, the American company Daisy Outdoor Products was unable to produce air rifles due to rationing of metal, so produced wooden popguns until the end of the war.  Currently, the largest producer of American-made popguns in the United States is Kraft-Tyme, Inc. located in Canton, TX.

See also
Popgun Plot, an alleged 1794 conspiracy to assassinate George III using a poisoned dart fired by an airgun

References

Toy weapons
Novelty items